Razdonbal (also Romanized as Razdanbel; also known as Rāz Dombal and Rāz-i-Dumbal) is a village in Qaen Rural District, in the Central District of Qaen County, South Khorasan Province, Iran. At the 2006 census, its population was 447, in 116 families.

References 

Populated places in Qaen County